Stefan Oleksandrovych Fedak (born 18 March 1998) is a Ukrainian professional footballer who plays as a left-back for Ukrainian club Uzhhorod.

References

External links
 
 
 

1998 births
Living people
Sportspeople from Uzhhorod
Ukrainian footballers
Association football defenders
FC Hoverla Uzhhorod players
FC Mynai players
FC Uzhhorod players
Ukrainian First League players
Ukrainian Second League players
Ukrainian Amateur Football Championship players